The 101st kilometre (sto pervyy kilometr) is a colloquial phrase for restrictions on freedom of movement in the Soviet Union.

Etymology
Soviet authorities forcibly removed all "undesirable elements" from Moscow, such as known loiterers, prostitutes, and alcoholics, beyond this boundary to improve the city's image for international visitors during the events of the 1980 Olympics.

Practice 
The 101st kilometre became a colloquial phrase for limits on freedom of movement under propiska, the Soviet system of controlling internal migration. During most of the Soviet era, criminals and other "undesirables" including supposedly rehabilitated political prisoners returning from the Gulags were often restricted from settling in larger urban centers such as Moscow. The propiska laws were intended in part to keep undesirable elements away from foreigners, who were usually restricted to areas within  of city centers, in a similar fashion to the 1980 Olympics. The rights of an ex-inmate to move freely about the country after release from a prison would be restricted for a long period of time.

In modern Russia, this 100 km restriction has been abolished — although a version of propiska still remains — and the expression is used in a context similar to that of boondocks.

See also 
 Lishenets
 Residential segregation
 Kármán line - another 100 km boundary; the "Boundary of Space".

References 

Soviet law
Soviet phraseology
Crime in the Soviet Union
History of human rights
1980 in the Soviet Union
Human rights in the Soviet Union